Death & Taxes is a 1993 documentary film directed by Jeffrey F. Jackson about Gordon Kahl, a tax protester who was killed in a shootout with local law enforcement officials in Smithville, Arkansas in 1983.

Synopsis
The documentary focuses on Kahl, a tax protester that was killed as part of a shootout in Arkansas in 1983. It utilized interviews and archive material, as well as footage from Kahl's exhumation and the 1991 made-for-TV movie In the Line of Duty: Manhunt in the Dakotas starring Rod Steiger.

Reception
Variety reviewed the documentary, writing that it was "a hard-hitting reinvestigation of the 1983 Gordon Kahl case, about which questions still linger. Jackson's unfazed, investigative reporting style approach and inventive handling of familiar material make this a controversial item for fests and progressive webs." Billboard also looked at the film and noted that it "has only a slim potential audience, but provides plenty of fodder for those interested in its subject matter."

References

External links
 Taos Land and Film Review Collection
 

American documentary films
1993 documentary films
1993 films
Documentary films about American politics
1990s English-language films
1990s American films